"It Must Be Love" is a song written by Craig Bickhardt and Jack Sundrud, and recorded by American country music singer Ty Herndon.  It was released in August 1998 as the second single from his album Big Hopes.  The song reached a peak of Number One on the Billboard Hot Country Singles & Tracks (now Hot Country Songs) charts, becoming the third and final Number One of his career.  It was also his highest entry on the Billboard Hot 100, peaking at number 38 on the chart.

Content
The song, written by Craig Bickhardt and Jack Sundrud, features the narrator of how he finds himself acting uncharacteristically, unable to control his emotions, because he is in love. The chorus uses a question-and-answer format, with the group Sons of the Desert singing the questions, as the narrator's conscience, and Herndon, the narrator, performing the answers — until the last line, where they all sing together. The song is in the key of E major.

Sundrud wrote the song while a member of the band Great Plains, and was working with Bickhardt for songs on what would become that band's second album Homeland. According to Sundrud, he wanted to write something that could be sung by all three of the band's vocalists; at the time, Bickhardt was in the process of selling his house and found himself having difficulty concentrating on songwriting until Sundrud engaged him in conversation. Great Plains ultimately did not record the song, thus allowing it to be available for Herndon.

Chart positions
"It Must Be Love" debuted at number 62 on the U.S. Billboard Hot Country Singles & Tracks for the week of August 15, 1998. The song spent twenty-six weeks on Billboard Hot Country Singles & Tracks (now Hot Country Songs), peaking at Number One on the chart week of December 5, 1998 and holding the position for one week. It also spent ten weeks on the Billboard Hot 100, peaking at number 38 and representing Herndon's only Top 40 hit on that chart.

References

1998 singles
1998 songs
Ty Herndon songs
Songs written by Craig Bickhardt
Epic Records singles
Song recordings produced by Doug Johnson (record producer)
Sons of the Desert (band) songs
Vocal collaborations